Ten Years of Triakel is the name of the fourth album by the Swedish folk band Triakel. It was released in 2005 as a limited, numbered edition on Triakel Records and features recordings from live Triakel performances between 1996 and 2005. The CD was not sold in stores.

Track listing
Majvisa (Mayday Song) - 3:05
Skepparschottis (The Skipper's Schottische) - 2:25
Du har låtit din kärlek få försvinna (You have let your love grow cold) - 3:28
Polska - 2:04
I Österland (Far in the east) - 3:12
Skämtvisa om roddare (Comic song about an oarsman) - 2:57
Grannar og vänner (Friends and neighbours) - 3:11
Bläck (Ink) - 4:04
Begåvningsmarsch (March played at parties) - 1:21
Emma solo - 2:15
Gammal og grå (Old and grey) - 2:34
Rallarguten (The Navvy lad) - 3:46
I himmelen (In paradise) - 4:49
För i värla (In the olden days) - 3:36
Den blomstertid nu kommer (The land bursts out in blossom) - 5:40
Solen sig sänker (The setting of the sun) - 2:50

Personnel
 Emma Härdelin - vocals/fiddle
 Janne Strömstedt - harmonium
 Kjell-Erik Eriksson - fiddle
 Björn Höglund- triangle on "Skepparschottis"
 Bo Lindberg - accordion on "Skepparschottis"
 Trispann - guest musicians on "Gammel og grå"
 Brina & Strings.si - guest musicians on "I himmelen"
 Emily Smith Band - guest musicians on "I himmelen"
 Rickard Näslin - guest musician on "För i värla"
 Triakel - all arrangements, all photos except cover photo
 Björn Höglund - mastering
 Lennart Jonasson - cover photo
 Mats Öhr / Inkprint promotion - cover design
 Alistair Cochrane - booklet translation

2005 albums
Triakel albums